Paolo Dezza, S.J. (13 December 1901 in Parma, Italy – 17 December 1999 in Rome)  was an Italian Jesuit cardinal who led the Pontifical Gregorian University during the pontificate of Pope Pius XII, whom he aided in the preparation of the dogma of the Assumption of Mary. He was confessor to Pope Paul VI and Paul's successor, Pope John Paul I, and was a teacher of Pope John Paul I's successor, Pope John Paul II.

In 1981, after Superior General Pedro Arrupe suffered a debilitating stroke, Pope John Paul II appointed Dezza to head the Jesuit order. In 1991, Dezza was named a cardinal.

Biography
Aged seventeen, Dezza entered the Jesuit order on 2 December 1918. He studied both in Madrid, Spain Naples, Italy and Innsbruck, Austria.  On 25 March 1928, he was ordained priest. A brilliant scholar, he was named professor of philosophy at the Gregorian University, but had to spend several years in Switzerland because of health complications.  In 1935, he was named Provincial for the region Venice and Milan, and in 1941, he was named head of the Gregorian University   With Robert Leiber, Augustin Bea,  Otto Faller, G. Hentrich  and  R. G. de Moos  he assisted in the preparation of the dogma of the Assumption of Mary. 
 
In 1945, he baptized Israel Zolli, the Chief Rabbi of Rome and head of the Jewish community, who, in recognition of the interventions  of Pope Pius XII for the Jews in Rome during German occupation,  took on the name Eugenio Zolli. Eugenio  Zolli worked for the rest of his life in the Gregorian University. Dezza was said to be a leading candidate  in the election for a new Jesuit General in 1946. From 1951 on he headed as General Secretary the International Federation of Catholic Universities (FIUC). He was confessor to two popes, Paul VI and John Paul I. He arrived at the Vatican every Friday evening at seven P.M. The only words he ever spoke about his long service to Pope Paul VI during his pontificate were, "This pope is a man of great joy."

After the death of Pope Paul VI, Dezza was more outspoken, saying, "If Paul VI  was not a saint, when he was elected Pope, he became one during his pontificate. I was able to witness not only with what energy and dedication he toiled for Christ and the Church  but also and above all, how much he suffered for Christ and the Church. I always admired not only his deep inner resignation but also his constant abandonment  to divine providence."

In 1981, the Jesuit Superior General, Pedro Arrupe, suffered a stroke. Leading Jesuits reportedly hoped that their Vicar General, an American, the Rev. Vincent O'Keefe, would be appointed interim Superior General until the next General Congregation of the Order. Pope John Paul II, recovering from his assassination attempt, unexpectedly intervened and appointed Dezza instead as a special pontifical delegate to serve as the Jesuits' interim leader. The pope knew Dezza personally as his teacher. As a student in the Belgian College in Rome after the war, he had attended Dezza's lectures  at the Pontifical Gregorian University. In 1983, at its 33rd General Congregation, the Jesuits elected Peter Hans Kolvenbach, a Dutch academic, as their new Superior General on the first ballot.

The Pope elevated Dezza, aged 89, to cardinal in 1991 as Cardinal-Deacon of S. Ignazio di Loyola a Campo Marzio. In 1999, the Pope celebrated the funeral mass at which he said:

Dezza is buried in the Church of Sant'Ignazio in Rome, near the grave of St. Robert Bellarmine.

Selected publications
Adnotationes in tractatum de ontologia. - Rome, 1930
La filosophia del christianesimo. -Milan, 1949
Metaphysica generalis. - Rome, 1964

Sources
"Homily of Pope John Paul II on Paolo Cardinal Dezza S J" on 20 December 1999  on the Vatican website 
Catholic Hierarchy 
NY Times obituary

References
 

1901 births
1999 deaths
Cardinals created by Pope John Paul II
20th-century Italian cardinals
20th-century Italian Jesuits
Italian religious writers
20th-century Italian Roman Catholic theologians
Pope John Paul II
Pope Paul VI
Pope Pius XII advisers
Catholic Mariology
Jesuit cardinals